Mokrance is a village and municipality in Košice-okolie District in the Kosice Region of eastern Slovakia.

History
In historical records, the village was first mentioned in 1317.

Geography
The village lies at an altitude of 212 metres and covers an area of 23.411 km². It has a population of about 1340 people.

External links

Villages and municipalities in Košice-okolie District